Danielithosia milina is a moth of the family Erebidae. It is found in Tibet, China.

References

Moths described in 1982
Lithosiina